A Janissary was a member of the elite infantry units that formed the Ottoman Sultan's household troops and the first modern standing army in Europe. The corps was most likely established under sultan Orhan (1324–1362), during the Viziership of Alaeddin.

Janissaries began as elite corps made up through the devşirme system of child levy enslavement, by which Christian Albanians, Romanians, Bulgarians, Croats, Greeks, and Serbs were taken, levied, subjected to forced circumcision and conversion to Islam, and incorporated into the Ottoman army. They became famed for internal cohesion cemented by strict discipline and order. Unlike typical slaves, they were paid regular salaries. Forbidden to marry before the age of 40 or engage in trade, their complete loyalty to the Sultan was expected. By the seventeenth century, due to a dramatic increase in the size of the Ottoman standing army, the corps' initially strict recruitment policy was relaxed. Civilians bought their way into it in order to benefit from the improved socioeconomic status it conferred upon them. Consequently, the corps gradually lost its military character, undergoing a process that has been described as "civilianization".

The Janissaries were a formidable military unit in the early centuries, but as Western Europe modernized its military organization and technology, the Janissaries became a reactionary force that resisted all change. Steadily the Ottoman military power became outdated, but when the Janissaries felt their privileges were being threatened, or outsiders wanted to modernize them, or they might be superseded by their cavalry rivals, they rose in rebellion. By the time the Janissaries were suppressed, it was too late for Ottoman military power to catch up with the West. The corps was abolished by Sultan Mahmud II in 1826 in the Auspicious Incident, in which 6,000 or more were executed.

Origins and history
The formation of the Janissaries has been dated to the reign of Murad I (r. 1362–1389), the third ruler of the Ottoman Empire. The Ottomans instituted a tax of one-fifth on all slaves taken in war, and it was from this pool of manpower that the sultans first constructed the Janissary corps as a personal army loyal only to the sultan.

From the 1380s to 1648, the Janissaries were gathered through the  system, which was abolished in 1648. There is however evidence that Jews tried to enroll into the system. Jews were not allowed in the janissary army, and so in suspected cases, the entire batch would be sent to the Imperial Arsenal as indentured laborers. Ottoman documents from the levy of the winter of 1603-1604 from Bosnia and Albania wrote to draw attention to some children as possibly being Jewish. According to the Encyclopedia Britannica, "in early days, all Christians were enrolled indiscriminately. Later, those from what is now Albania, Bosnia, and Bulgaria were preferred."

They were subjected to strict discipline, but were paid salaries and pensions upon retirement and formed their own distinctive social class. As such, they became one of the ruling classes of the Ottoman Empire, rivalling the Turkish aristocracy. The brightest of the Janissaries were sent to the palace institution, Enderun. Through a system of meritocracy, the Janissaries held enormous power, stopping all efforts to reform the military.

According to military historian Michael Antonucci and economic historians Glenn Hubbard and Tim Kane, the Turkish administrators would scour their regions (but especially the Balkans) every five years for the strongest sons of the sultan's Christian subjects. These boys (usually between the ages of 6 and 14) were then taken from their parents, circumcised, and sent to Turkish families in the provinces to be raised as Muslims and learn Turkish language and customs. Once their military training began, they were subjected to severe discipline, being prohibited from growing a beard, taking up a skill other than soldiering, and marrying. As a result, the Janissaries were extremely well-disciplined troops and became members of the  class, the first-class citizens or military class. Most were of non-Muslim origin because it was not permissible to enslave a Muslim.

It was a similar system to the Iranian Safavid, Afsharid, and Qajar era ghilmans, who were drawn from converted Circassians, Georgians, and Armenians, and in the same way as with the Ottoman's Janissaries who had to replace the unreliable ghazis. They were initially created as a counterbalance to the tribal, ethnic and favoured interests the Qizilbash gave, which make a system imbalanced.

In the late 16th century, a sultan gave in to the pressures of the Corps and permitted Janissary children to become members of the Corps, a practice strictly forbidden for the previous 300 years. According to paintings of the era, they were also permitted to grow beards. Consequently, the formerly strict rules of succession became open to interpretation. While they advanced their own power, the Janissaries also helped to keep the system from changing in other progressive ways, and according to some scholars the corps shared responsibility for the political stagnation of Istanbul.

Greek Historian Dimitri Kitsikis in his book Türk Yunan İmparatorluğu ("Turco-Greek Empire") states that many Bosnian Christian families were willing to comply with the devşirme because it offered a possibility of social advancement. Conscripts could one day become Janissary colonels, statesmen who might one day return to their home region as governors, or even Grand Viziers or Beylerbeys (governor generals).

Some of the most famous Janissaries include George Kastrioti Skanderbeg, an Albanian who defected and led a 25‑year Albanian revolt against the Ottomans. Another was Sokollu Mehmed Paşa, a Bosnian Serb who became a grand vizier, served three sultans, and was the de facto ruler of the Ottoman Empire for more than 14 years.

Characteristics
The Janissary corps were distinctive in a number of ways. They wore unique uniforms, were paid regular salaries (including bonuses) for their service, marched to music (the mehter), lived in barracks and were the first corps to make extensive use of firearms. A Janissary battalion was a close-knit community, effectively the soldier's family. By tradition, the Sultan himself, after authorizing the payments to the Janissaries, visited the barracks dressed as a janissary trooper, and received his pay alongside the other men of the First Division. They also served as policemen, palace guards, and firefighters during peacetime. The Janissaries also enjoyed far better support on campaign than other armies of the time. They were part of a well-organized military machine, in which one support corps prepared the roads while others pitched tents and baked the bread. Their weapons and ammunition were transported and re-supplied by the cebeci corps. They campaigned with their own medical teams of Muslim and Jewish surgeons and their sick and wounded were evacuated to dedicated mobile hospitals set up behind the lines.

These differences, along with an impressive war-record, made the Janissaries a subject of interest and study by foreigners during their own time. Although eventually the concept of a modern army incorporated and surpassed most of the distinctions of the Janissaries and the corps was eventually dissolved, the image of the Janissary has remained as one of the symbols of the Ottomans in the western psyche. By the mid-18th century, they had taken up many trades and gained the right to marry and enroll their children in the corps and very few continued to live in the barracks. Many of them became administrators and scholars. Retired or discharged Janissaries received pensions, and their children were also looked after.

Recruitment, training and status

The first Janissary units were formed from prisoners of war and slaves, probably as a result of the sultan taking his traditional one-fifth share of his army's plunder in kind rather than cash; however the continuing enslaving of dhimmi constituted a continuing abuse of a subject population. For a while, the Ottoman government supplied the Janissary corps with recruits from the devşirme system. Children were kidnapped at a young age and turned into soldiers in an attempt to make the soldiers faithful to the sultan. The social status of devşirme recruits took on an immediate positive change, acquiring a greater guarantee of governmental rights and financial opportunities. In poor areas officials were bribed by parents to make them take their sons, thus they would have better chances in life. Initially the recruiters favoured Greeks and Albanians. As borders of the Ottoman Empire expanded, the devşirme was extended to include Armenians, Bulgarians, Croats, Hungarians, Serbs and later islamized people from Bosnia and Herzegovina, and, in rare instances, Romanians, Georgians, Ukrainians and southern Russians. While the deportation and enslavement of children was sometimes desired by their parents and earned them greater social status through the Janissary corps, the devşirme could fall within the context of cultural genocide. However, the freedom and power offered to Janissaries could indicate that the recruitment system was more aimed to be conscription, with an added objective of somewhat homogenizing the population of a very diverse empire.

This "child levy" system was regularly implemented during the 15th-16th centuries, the first two centuries of its existence. Some historians argue this system contributed to the Ottoman states efforts at compulsory conversion and "islamization" of its non-Muslim populations. Radushev states this recruitment system can be bisected into two periods, its first, or classical period, encompassing those first two centuries of regular execution and utilization to supply recruits; and a second period which more focuses on its gradual change, decline, and ultimate abandonment, beginning in the 17th century.

In response to foreign threats, the Ottoman government chose to rapidly expand the size of the corps after the 1570s. Janissaries spent shorter periods of time in training as acemi oğlans, as the average age of recruitment increased from 13.5 in the 1490s to 16.6 in 1603. This reflected not only the Ottomans' greater need for manpower but also the shorter training time necessary to produce skilled musketeers in comparison with archers. However, this change alone was not enough to produce the necessary manpower, and consequently the traditional limitation of recruitment to boys conscripted in the devşirme was lifted. Membership was opened up to free-born Muslims, both recruits hand-picked by the commander of the Janissaries, as well as the sons of current members of the Ottoman standing army. By the middle of the seventeenth century, the devşirme had largely been abandoned as a method of recruitment.

The prescribed daily rate of pay for entry-level Janissaries in the time of Ahmet I was three Akçes. Promotion to a cavalry regiment implied a minimum salary of 10 Akçes. Janissaries received a sum of 12 Akçes every three months for clothing incidentals and 30 Akçes for weaponry, with an additional allowance for ammunition as well.

Training

When a non-Muslim boy was recruited under the devşirme system, he would first be sent to selected Turkish families in the provinces to learn Turkish, the rules of Islam (i.e. to be converted to Islam) and the customs and cultures of Ottoman society. After completing this period, acemi (new recruit) boys were gathered for training at the Enderun "acemi oğlan" school in the capital city. There, young cadets would be selected for their talents in different areas to train as engineers, artisans, riflemen, clerics, archers, artillery, and so forth. Janissaries trained under strict discipline with hard labour and in practically monastic conditions in acemi oğlan ("rookie" or "cadet") schools, where they were expected to remain celibate. Unlike other Muslims, they were expressly forbidden to wear beards, only a moustache. These rules were obeyed by Janissaries, at least until the 18th century when they also began to engage in other crafts and trades, breaking another of the original rules. In the late 16th century a sultan gave in to the pressures of the Janissary Corps and permitted Janissary children to become members of the Corps, a practice strictly forbidden for 200 years. Consequently, succession rules, formerly strict, became open to interpretation. They gained their own power but kept the system from changing in other progressive ways.

For all practical purposes, Janissaries belonged to the Sultan and they were regarded as the protectors of the throne and the Sultan. Janissaries were taught to consider the corps their home and family, and the Sultan as their father. Only those who proved strong enough earned the rank of true Janissary at the age of 24 or 25. The Ocak inherited the property of dead Janissaries, thus acquiring wealth. Janissaries also learned to follow the dictates of the dervish saint Haji Bektash Veli, disciples of whom had blessed the first troops. Bektashi served as a kind of chaplain for Janissaries. In this and in their secluded life, Janissaries resembled Christian military orders like the Knights Hospitaller. As a symbol of their devotion to the order, Janissaries wore special hats called "börk". These hats also had a holding place in front, called the "kaşıklık", for a spoon. This symbolized the "kaşık kardeşliği", or the "brotherhood of the spoon", which reflected a sense of comradeship among the Janissaries who ate, slept, fought and died together.

Even after the rapid expansion of the size of the corps at the end of the sixteenth century, the Janissaries continued to undergo strict training and discipline. The Janissaries experimented with new forms of battlefield tactics, and in 1605 became one of the first armies in Europe to implement rotating lines of volley fire in battle.

Organization

The corps was organized in ortas  (literally: center). An orta (equivalent to a battalion) was headed by a çorbaci. All ortas together comprised the Janissary corps proper and its organization, named ocak (literally "hearth"). Suleiman I had 165 ortas and the number increased over time to 196. While the Sultan was the supreme commander of the Ottoman Army and of the Janissaries in particular, the corps was organized and led by a commander, the ağa. The corps was divided into three sub-corps:
 the cemaat (frontier troops; also spelled jemaat in old sources), with 101 ortas
 the bölük or beylik, (the Sultan's own bodyguard), with 61 ortas
 the sekban or seymen, with 34 ortas

In addition there were also 34 ortas of the ajemi (cadets). A semi-autonomous Janissary corps was permanently based in Algiers, called the Odjak of Algiers.

Originally Janissaries could be promoted only through seniority and within their own orta. They could leave the unit only to assume command of another. Only Janissaries' own commanding officers could punish them. The rank names were based on positions in the kitchen staff or Sultan's royal hunters; 64th and 65th Orta 'Greyhound Keepers' comprised as the only Janissary cavalry, perhaps to emphasise that Janissaries were servants of the Sultan. Local Janissaries, stationed in a town or city for a long time, were known as yerliyyas.

Corps strength
Even though the Janissaries were part of the royal army and personal guards of the sultan, the corps was not the main force of the Ottoman military. In the classical period, Janissaries were only one-tenth of the overall Ottoman army, while the traditional Turkish cavalry made up the rest of the main battle force. According to David Nicolle, the number of Janissaries in the 14th century was 1,000 and about 6,000 in 1475. The same source estimates the number of Timarli Sipahi, the provincial cavalry which constituted the main force of the army at 40,000.

Beginning in the 1530s, the size of the Janissary corps began to dramatically expand, a result of the rapid conquests the Ottomans were carrying out during those years. Janissaries were used extensively to garrison fortresses and for siege warfare, which was becoming increasingly important for the Ottoman military. The pace of expansion increased after the 1570s, due to the initiation of a series of wars with the Safavid Empire and, after 1593, with the Habsburg monarchy. By 1609, the size of the corps had stabilized at approximately 40,000 men, but increased again later in the century, during the period of the Cretan War (1645–69) and particularly the War of the Holy League (1683–99).

Equipment

During the initial period of formation, Janissaries were expert archers, but they began adopting firearms as soon as such became available during the 1440s. The siege of Vienna in 1529 confirmed the reputation of their engineers, e.g. sappers and miners. In melee combat they used axes and kilijs. Originally in peacetime they could carry only clubs or daggers, unless they served as border troops. Turkish yatagan swords were the signature weapon of the Janissaries, almost a symbol of the corps. Janissaries who guarded the palace (Zülüflü Baltacılar) carried long-shafted axes and halberds.

By the early 16th century, the Janissaries were equipped with and were skilled with muskets. In particular, they used a massive "trench gun", firing an  ball, which was "feared by their enemies". Janissaries also made extensive use of early grenades and hand cannons, such as the abus gun. Pistols were not initially popular but they became so after the Cretan War (1645–1669).

Battles
The Ottoman Empire used Janissaries in all its major campaigns, including the 1453 capture of Constantinople, the defeat of the Mamluk Sultanate of Cairo and wars against Hungary and Austria. Janissary troops were always led to the battle by the Sultan himself, and always had a share of the loot. The Janissary corps was the only infantry division of the Ottoman army. In battle the Janissaries' main mission was to protect the Sultan, using cannon and smaller firearms, and holding the centre of the army against enemy attack during the strategic fake forfeit of Turkish cavalry. The Janissary corps also included smaller expert teams: explosive experts, engineers and technicians, sharpshooters (with arrow and rifle) and sappers who dug tunnels under fortresses, etc.

Revolts and disbandment

As Janissaries became aware of their own importance, they began to desire a better life. By the early 17th century Janissaries had such prestige and influence that they dominated the government. They could mutiny, dictate policy, and hinder efforts to modernize the army structure. Additionally, the Janissaries found they could change Sultans as they wished through palace coups. They made themselves landholders and tradesmen. They would also limit the enlistment to the sons of former Janissaries who did not have to go through the original training period in the acemi oğlan, as well as avoiding the physical selection, thereby reducing their military value. When Janissaries could practically extort money from the Sultan and business and family life replaced martial fervour, their effectiveness as combat troops decreased. The northern borders of the Ottoman Empire slowly began to shrink southwards after the second Battle of Vienna in 1683.

In 1449, they revolted for the first time, demanding higher wages, which they obtained. The stage was set for a decadent evolution, like that of the Streltsy of Tsar Peter's Russia or that of the Praetorian Guard which proved the greatest threat to Roman emperors, rather than effective protection. After 1451, every new Sultan felt obligated to pay each Janissary a reward and raise his pay rank (although since early Ottoman times, every other member of the Topkapi court received a pay raise as well). Sultan Selim II gave Janissaries permission to marry in 1566, undermining the exclusivity of loyalty to the dynasty. By 1622, the Janissaries were a "serious threat" to the stability of the Empire. Through their "greed and indiscipline", they were now a law unto themselves and, against modern European armies, ineffective on the battlefield as a fighting force. In 1622, the teenage Sultan Osman II, after a defeat during war against Poland, determined to curb Janissaries' excesses. Outraged at becoming "subject to his own slaves", he tried to disband the Janissary corps, blaming it for the disaster during the Polish war. In the spring, hearing rumours that the Sultan was preparing to move against them, the Janissaries revolted and took the Sultan captive, imprisoning him in the notorious Seven Towers: he was murdered shortly afterward .

The extravagant parties of the Ottoman ruling classes during the Tulip Period caused a lot of unrest among the Ottoman population. In September 1730, janissaries headed by Patrona Halil backed in Istanbul a rebellion by 12,000 Albanian troops which caused the abdication of Sultan Ahmed III and the death of the Grand Vizier Damad Ibrahim. The rebellion was crashed in three weeks with the massacre of 7,000 rebels, but it marked the end of the Tulip Era and the beginning of Sultan Mahmud I's reign. In 1804, the Dahias, the Janissary junta that ruled Serbia at the time, having taken power in the Sanjak of Smederevo in defiance of the Sultan, feared that the Sultan would make use of the Serbs to oust them. To forestall this they decided to execute all prominent nobles throughout Central Serbia, a move known as the Slaughter of the Knezes. According to historical sources of the city of Valjevo, the heads of the murdered men were put on public display in the central square to serve as an example to those who might plot against the rule of the Janissaries. The event triggered the start of the Serbian Revolution with the First Serbian Uprising aimed at putting an end to the 370 years of Ottoman occupation of modern Serbia.

In 1807 a Janissary revolt deposed Sultan Selim III, who had tried to modernize the army along Western European lines. This modern army that Selim III created was called Nizam-ı Cedid. His supporters failed to recapture power before Mustafa IV had him killed, but elevated Mahmud II to the throne in 1808. When the Janissaries threatened to oust Mahmud II, he had the captured Mustafa executed and eventually came to a compromise with the Janissaries. Ever mindful of the threat that the Janissaries posed, the sultan spent the next years discreetly securing his position. The Janissaries' abuse of power, military ineffectiveness, resistance to reform, and the cost of salaries to 135,000 men, many of whom were not actually serving soldiers, had all become intolerable.

By 1826, the sultan was ready to move against the Janissaries in favour of a more modern military. The sultan informed them, through a fatwa, that he was forming a new army, organised and trained along modern European lines. As predicted, they mutinied, advancing on the sultan's palace. In the ensuing fight, the Janissaries' barracks were set aflame by artillery fire, resulting in 4,000 Janissary fatalities. The survivors were either exiled or executed, and their possessions were confiscated by the Sultan. This event is now called the Auspicious Incident. The last of the Janissaries were then put to death by decapitation in what was later called the Tower of Blood, in Thessaloniki.

After the Janissaries were disbanded by Mahmud II, he then created a new army soon after recruiting 12,000 troops. This new army was formally named the Trained Victorious Soldiers of Muhammad, the Mansure Army for short. By 1830, the army expanded to 27,000 troops and included the Sipahi cavalry. By 1838, all Ottoman fighting corps were included and the army changed its name to the Ordered troops. This military corps lasted until the end of the empire's history.

Janissary music

The military music of the Janissaries was noted for its powerful percussion and shrill winds combining kös (giant timpani), davul (bass drum), zurna (a loud shawm), naffir, or boru (natural trumpet), çevgan bells, triangle (a borrowing from Europe), and cymbals (zil), among others. Janissary music influenced European classical musicians such as Wolfgang Amadeus Mozart and Ludwig van Beethoven, both of whom composed music in the Turkish style. Examples include Mozart's Piano Sonata No. 11 (c. 1783), Beethoven's incidental music for The Ruins of Athens (1811), and the final movement of Beethoven's Symphony No. 9, although the Beethoven example is now considered a march rather than Alla turca.

Sultan Mahmud II abolished the mehter band in 1826 along with the Janissary corps. Mahmud replaced the mehter band in 1828 with a European style military band trained by Giuseppe Donizetti. In modern times, although the Janissary corps no longer exists as a professional fighting force, the tradition of Mehter music is carried on as a cultural and tourist attraction.

In 1952, the Janissary military band, Mehterân, was organized again under the auspices of the Istanbul Military Museum. They hold performances during some national holidays as well as in some parades during days of historical importance. For more details, see Turkish music (style) and Mehter.

Popular culture

 In Bulgaria and elsewhere, and for centuries in Ukraine, the word Janissar (яничар) is used as a synonym of the word renegade.
 The Janissary Tree, a novel by Jason Goodwin set in 19th-century Istanbul
 The Sultan's Helmsman, a historical novel of the Ottoman Navy and Renaissance Italy
 Salman Rushdie's novel The Enchantress of Florence details the life, organization, and origins of the Janissaries. One of the lead characters of the novel, Antonio Argalia, is the head of the Ottoman Janissaries.
 The novel Janissaries by David Drake
 Muhteşem Yüzyıl (The Magnificent Century) is a 2011–2012 Turkish historical fiction television series. Written by Meral Okay and Yılmaz Şahin. The Janissaries are portrayed throughout the series as part of the Sultan's royal bodyguard. The First Oath of their military order is recited in Season 1 at the Ceremony of Payment. 
The popular song in Serbian, Janissar (Јањичар) by Predrag Gojković Cune 
 Janissaries are the unique unit of the Ottoman Empire in Civilization IV, V, expansions of VI, Cossacks (video games series), Age of Empires II, Age of Empires III, and Rise of Nations.
 The Janissaries during the rule of Sultan Bayezid II are featured heavily in Assassin's Creed: Revelations.
 Janissaries appear in several books in the Lymond Chronicles by Dorothy Dunnett.
 In the song "Winged Hussars" by Sabaton about the Battle of Vienna 1683 the question is asked if "Janissaries are you ready to die?" to illustrate the impact of the arrival of the winged hussars in the battle.
 In the 2020 Turkish historical docudrama Rise of Empires: Ottoman, Janissaries appear throughout the show in both seasons as part of Mehmed II's army.

See also
 Devşirme system
 Ghilman
 Mamluk
 Military of the Ottoman Empire
 Saqaliba
 Genízaro
 Ottoman decline thesis
 The Auspicious Incident
 Agha, a civilian and military title in the Ottoman Empire
 Malassay, elite infantry of the Adal Sultanate

References

Notes

Bibliography

 
 Aksan, Virginia H. "Whatever Happened to the Janissaries? Mobilization for the 1768–1774 Russo-Ottoman War." War in History (1998) 5#1 pp: 23–36. online 
 
 Benesch, Oleg. "Comparing Warrior Traditions: How the Janissaries and Samurai Maintained Their Status and Privileges During Centuries of Peace." Comparative Civilizations Review 55.55 (2006): 6:37-55 Online.
 
 Cleveland, William L. A History of the Modern Middle East (Boulder: Westview, 2004)
 Goodwin, Godfrey (2001). The Janissaries. UK: Saqi Books. ; anecdotal and not scholarly says Aksan (1998)
 
 
 
 Kitsikis, Dimitri, (1985, 1991, 1994). L'Empire ottoman. Paris,: Presses Universitaires de France.  
 
 
 
 Shaw, Stanford J. (1976). History of the Ottoman Empire and Modern Turkey (Vol. I). New York: Cambridge University Press. 
 Shaw, Stanford J. & Shaw, Ezel Kural (1977). History of the Ottoman Empire and Modern Turkey (Vol. II). New York: Cambridge University Press.

External links

 History of the Janissary Music
 Janissary section on German-language website about Ottoman empire  (not yet exploited) 
 "Janissary," Britannica.com

 
1360s establishments in the Ottoman Empire
Military units and formations disestablished in 1826
Infantry
Islam and violence
Warfare of the Middle Ages
Military units and formations of the medieval Islamic world
Military units and formations of the Ottoman Empire
Turkish words and phrases
Slaves from the Ottoman Empire
Christians from the Ottoman Empire
Military units and formations established in the 14th century
Military slavery
Bektashi Order
1826 disestablishments in the Ottoman Empire